Bhagirath Bhanwar (2 December 1936 - 10 February 2004) was an Indian politician. He was elected to the lower House of Parliament, the Lok Sabha, from Ratlam Jhabua, Madhya Pradesh, India.

References

External links
 Official biographical sketch in Parliament of India website

India MPs 1971–1977
India MPs 1977–1979
Janata Party politicians
Samyukta Socialist Party politicians
1936 births
2004 deaths